Xylocopa micheneri is a species of carpenter bee in the family Apidae. It is found in Central America and North America.

Subspecies
These two subspecies belong to the species Xylocopa micheneri:
 Xylocopa micheneri decipiens Hurd, 1978
 Xylocopa micheneri micheneri Hurd, 1978

References

micheneri
Articles created by Qbugbot
Insects described in 1978